Gilles Pagnon (born 20 February 1984) is a German international rugby union player, playing for RC Orléans in the Fédérale 1 and the German national rugby union team.

Pagnon made his debut for Germany on 13 March 2010 against Russia.

Born in Germany, which made him eligible for the German national team, Pagnon has played in France throughout his career, at RC Carqueiranne-Hyères and RC Orléans in the Fédérale 1 and at Stade Montois in the Pro D2.

Honors
 Rugby Pro D2:
 Promotion playoff winners: 2008

Stats
Gilles Pagnon's personal statistics in club and international rugby:

Club

 As of 22 December 2010

National team

 As of 8 April 2012

References

External links
 Gilles Pagnon at scrum.com
   Gilles Pagnon at totalrugby.de
 Pagnon Gilles at itsrugby.fr 
  Gilles Pagnon at the DRV website

1984 births
Living people
German rugby union players
Germany international rugby union players
RC Orléans players
Rugby union centres